Rhizoxin is an antimitotic agent with anti-tumor activity. It is isolated from a pathogenic plant fungus (Rhizopus microsporus) which causes rice seedling blight.

Biosynthesis

Rhizoxin is biosynthesised by Paraburkholderia rhizoxinica, a bacterial endosymbiont of the fungus Rhizopus microsporus. It is one of a large group of rhizoxin-like compounds produced by the bacteria. The bacterial endosymbiont can be grown independently in culture. This may allow easy harvesting of rhizoxin and the related compounds avoiding total chemical synthesis, although total chemical synthesis is possible.

Cytotoxic function

Rhizoxin binds beta tubulin in eukaryotic cells disrupting microtubule formation. This, in turn, prevents formation of the mitotic spindle inhibiting cell division. Additionally rhizoxin can depolymerise assembled microtubules. The function of rhizoxin is similar to Vinca alkaloids.

Rhizoxin has undergone clinical trials as an anti-cancer drug although it did not reach later stages of clinical trials due to low activity in vivo. Related compounds to rhizoxin may have improved biological activity.

Structure

Rhizoxin is a 16-membered lactone ring connected to an oxazole ring by a long unsaturated chain.

References

Oxazoles
Macrolides
Epoxides
Polyenes
Microtubule inhibitors